Chananya Techajaksemar, nicknamed View also known as 'Point of View', is a Thai YouTuber /Content Creator. She has been making videos since 2009. She is also an author of several books such as Wannakhadi Thai Digest, a book that breaks down stories of Thai literature, making them accessible to young people.

Education
She got high school diploma from Chulalongkorn University Demonstration School in Science-Mathematic program. Moreover, she graduated from Chulalongkorn University with bachelor's degree of Arts majoring in Thai language and literature.

Working career
She started her career as a writer and then she started to make videos on YouTube. Furthermore, she stated that being a YouTuber is hard work. According to her degree, her video content is about Thai literature and history as well as World literature and history. She won the Popular Vote at the Thailand Best Blog Awards 2018.

References

Living people
Chananya Techajaksemar
1990 births